The 2020 Veikkausliiga was the 90th season of top-tier football in Finland with KuPS being the defending champions.

New league format
Veikkausliiga adopted a new league format for the 2019 season. Each team played against each other twice in the regular season. After the regular season the top six teams advanced to the Championship Series which determines the champion and European tournament qualification places. The bottom six teams advanced to the Challenger Series. The best team from the Challenger Series plays in a tournament against the Championship Series' 4th, 5th, and 6th place teams. The winner from that plays in a final series against the 3rd best team from the Championship Series. The last UEFA Europa Conference League qualification place goes to the winner of that final series.

The bottom team from the Challenger Series will relegate to the Ykkönen, and second to last team will play in a relegation play-off series against the 2nd best team from Ykkönen.

Teams
VPS were relegated to Ykkönen after finishing at the bottom of the 2019 season. Their place was taken by Ykkönen champions FC Haka. 

KPV as 11th-placed team lost their Veikkausliiga spot after losing to second-placed Ykkönen team TPS in a relegation/promotion playoff.

Stadiums and locations

League table
On 28 October 2020, it was decided to cancel the championship and relegation round due to the COVID-19 pandemic in Finland, and the regular season standings after 22 rounds would be considered final.

Results

European competition 
Five teams would originally play for a spot in the 2021–22 UEFA Europa Conference League first qualifying round, but this was cancelled and the spot would be awarded based on regular season position.

Relegation play-offs

1–1 on aggregate. KTP won on away goals.

Season statistics

Top scorers
As of 4 November 2020

Awards

Annual awards

Team of the Year

References

Veikkausliiga seasons
Vei
Fin
Fin
Veikkausliiga, 2020